The Universidad de Ibagué (Spanish: Universidad de Ibagué) is a private university located in Ibagué, Colombia. It was founded in 1980 as University Corporation of Ibagué (Spanish: Corporación Universitaria de Ibagué, Coruniversitaria) by business and civic leaders from Tolima.

References

External links 
 

Universities and colleges in Colombia
Educational institutions established in 1980
1980 establishments in Colombia